Lathicrossa leucocentra is a species of moth in the family Oecophoridae first described by Edward Meyrick in 1883. It is endemic to New Zealand.

References

Xyloryctidae
Moths described in 1883
Moths of New Zealand
Taxa named by Edward Meyrick
Endemic fauna of New Zealand
Endemic moths of New Zealand